Chattanooga shooting may refer to:

2015 Chattanooga shootings
2022 Chattanooga shooting